Gino Pollini (19 January 1903 in Rovereto – 25 January 1991 in Milan) was an Italian architect.

Life 
Gino Pollini was born in Rovereto on January 19, 1903, to Luigi Pollini, a shopkeeper, and Teresa Miori Pollini. At the time of Pollini's birth, Rovereto was part of Austria. After WWI, the city became part of the north eastern region of Trentino–Alto Adige in Italy. In 1921, he began studies at the Politecnico di Milano, taking courses off and on, and received his architecture degree in 1927. He married Renata Melotti, sister of sculptor Fausto Melotti and cousin of theorist Carlo Belli, in February 1931. They had a child Maurizio in 1942.

Career
In 1926 Pollini joined Gruppo 7 (Sebastiano Larco, Guido Frette, Carlo Enrico Rava,  Luigi Figini, Giuseppe Terragni, Ubaldo Castagnoli), and from 1929 he worked in collaboration with Luigi Figini. Figini & Pollini had a long association with the Olivetti company from 1934 through 1957, designing many of their headquarters buildings at Ivrea. In 1927, Pollini was invited by the architect Alberto Sartoris to travel to Stuttgart with Gruppo 7 members Rava and Libera to work on clarifying a new language for modernist architecture. He also taught architecture in Milan and Palermo.

References 

1903 births
1991 deaths
People from Rovereto
Modernist architects from Italy
Congrès International d'Architecture Moderne members
20th-century Italian architects